Cauley Woodrow (born 2 December 1994) is an English professional footballer who plays as a forward for EFL Championship club Luton Town. He made his debut in the Football League for Southend United in September 2013.

Woodrow previously played for Conference Premier club Luton Town, for whom he made three appearances in the FA Trophy as a 16-year-old. While a Luton player in 2011, he became the first non-League footballer to be capped at youth level for England since the 1970s.

Club career

Early life and career
Woodrow was born in Hemel Hempstead, Hertfordshire, where he attended Hemel Hempstead School. His father, Martin Patching, is a former professional footballer. As a young boy, Woodrow trained with Tottenham Hotspur. He joined Buckhurst Hill ahead of the 2007–08 season. He scored eight goals in one of his early games, and played in the team that represented the South of England in the national finals of the Tesco Cup in 2008. Although his team lost in the semi-final, Woodrow received the award for best forward in the competition.

He went on to join Conference Premier club Luton Town. In the summer of 2010, he was part of their under-15 team that reached the final of a 40-team tournament involving several major European clubs' youngsters, and in September he scored six goals in an FA Youth Cup qualifying match against Cogenhoe United. While still 15, he was an unused substitute for the first team's FA Cup match at Corby Town, and he made his senior debut on 14 December, twelve days after his 16th birthday, as Luton won an FA Trophy first-round replay at Welling United. Woodrow played twice more in the FA Trophy: against Uxbridge, he set up the third goal in a 4–0 win, and against Gloucester City, he won the free kick from which Luton scored the only goal of the game to progress to the quarter-final. He was called up to the England under-17 team for a tournament in Portugal in February 2011.

Fulham

Early Fulham career
In March 2011, Woodrow signed for Premier League club Fulham for a "six-figure" fee, possibly rising to seven figures depending on the player's future progress; the deal included what Luton's managing director described as "a very healthy sell-on clause". He took up a scholarship with the club in July, after he left school, and signed a two-and-a-half-year professional contract on his 17th birthday. Although injury interrupted his first season, he was still able to contribute to the under-18 team winning the 2011–12 Premier Academy League – he scored in the final as Fulham beat Blackburn Rovers 2–1 – scored twice as Fulham came from behind to eliminate Manchester City from the 2011–12 FA Youth Cup at the last 16 stage, played for the reserve team, and occasionally trained with the first team. A December 2012 feature on Fulham's website listed his strengths as "scoring goals, clever movement and awareness around the box".

Woodrow was a member of Fulham's under-19 team at the 2013 Dallas Cup. He had a penalty saved but still scored twice as his team beat Kashiwa Reysol's youngsters 5–1 to win the tournament. He captained Fulham's under-18s to a second successive Premier Academy League title in 2013. Ahead of the 2013–14 season, Woodrow signed a contract extension until 2016.

Woodrow made his Premier League debut on 8 March 2014, playing 75 minutes of Fulham's 3–1 defeat to Cardiff City at the Cardiff City Stadium, and scored his first goal for the club in a 2–2 draw against Crystal Palace on the final day of the season.

Southend United loan
He joined League Two club Southend United on 2 September 2013 on a one-month loan, and went straight into the starting eleven to make his Football League debut five days later, in a 3–1 home defeat to Morecambe. He played the first hour of the match, and came close to scoring with a header. After two starts and two substitute appearances, Woodrow's loan was extended for a further 28 days. He scored his first senior goals in the Football League Trophy against Dagenham & Redbridge on 8 October. Brought on at half-time with Southend a goal behind, he headed the equaliser from Ben Coker's cross after just six minutes on the field, and three minutes later gave his side the lead when the goalkeeper could only parry Brian Saah's shot.

The loan was extended in November until 4 May 2014, with a further extension if Southend were to reach the play-offs. Woodrow was sent off for elbowing an opponent only four minutes after entering the match at Portsmouth as a second-half substitute. Despite the numerical disadvantage, Southend came back from a goal behind at the time of the incident to win 2–1. On Boxing Day 2013, Woodrow scored a 75th-minute winner in a 1–0 victory away to AFC Wimbledon after coming off the bench. His loan spell was cut short on 29 January 2014, as Fulham were disappointed with the number of games he had started for Southend.

Further loans
Having started only one league match for Fulham in the 2016–17 season, Woodrow joined another Championship club, Burton Albion, on 27 January 2017 on loan until the end of the season. He scored his first goal for the club a 2–1 win over Wolverhampton Wanderers on 4 February 2017, with a close-range shot in the fourth minute of stoppage time in.

Woodrow signed a season-long loan with Bristol City on 17 August 2017. He scored his first goal for Bristol City in a 4–1 win against Derby County on 16 September 2017.

Barnsley
Woodrow joined League One club Barnsley on 24 August 2018 on loan until January 2019, ahead of a proposed permanent transfer. He signed for Barnsley permanently on 3 January 2019 on a two-and-a-half-year contract, with the option of a further year in the club's favour, for an undisclosed fee.

He signed a new contract in May 2019, running until 2022.

Return to Luton Town
On 21 June 2022, Woodrow signed for Championship side Luton Town returning after 11 years. He also scored the winner during the Boxing Day fixture vs Norwich.

International career
Woodrow was called up to the England under-17 team for the 2011 Algarve Tournament in February. When he made his debut, scoring the equalising goal in a 1–1 draw with Romania, he became the first non-League footballer to play for an England youth team since Bob Oates of Ashley Road in 1974. He played in England's other two matches in the tournament, against Germany and Portugal, as a second-half substitute. He was called up to England U21s for the first time in May 2014 for that summer's Toulon Tournament and European qualifiers.

Career statistics

Honours
Barnsley
EFL League One runner-up: 2018–19

England U21
Toulon Tournament: 2016

References

External links

Profile at the Barnsley F.C. website

1994 births
Living people
Sportspeople from Hemel Hempstead
Footballers from Hertfordshire
English footballers
England youth international footballers
England under-21 international footballers
Association football forwards
Luton Town F.C. players
Fulham F.C. players
Southend United F.C. players
Burton Albion F.C. players
Bristol City F.C. players
Barnsley F.C. players
English Football League players
Premier League players